Monika Biskopstø (born 29 December 1994) is a Faroese football goalkeeper who plays for Kí and the Faroe Islands women's national football team.

Honours 

KÍ
1. deild kvinnur: 2011, 2012, 2013, 2014, 2015
Steypakappingin kvinnur: 2012, 2013, 2014, 2015

References 

1994 births
Living people
Faroese women's footballers
Faroe Islands women's youth international footballers
Faroe Islands women's international footballers
Women's association football goalkeepers
KÍ Klaksvík players
AaB Fodbold players
Faroese expatriate footballers
Expatriate women's footballers in Denmark